Viola is surname. Notable people with the surname include:

Al Viola (1919–2007), American jazz guitarist
Alessio Viola (born 1990), Italian footballer
Alfonso dalla Viola (c. 1508–c. 1573), Italian composer
Ali Viola (born 1976), former collegiate All-American softball player
Bill Viola (born 1951), American video artist
Domenico Viola (c.1610-1620 - 1696), Italian painter
Fernando Viola (1951–2001), Italian footballer
 A family of American sportspeople:
 Frank Viola (born 1960), baseball player and coach
 Frank Viola III (born 1984), son; baseball player and broadcaster
 Brittany Viola (born 1987), daughter; platform diver
Giovanni Viola (1926–2008), Italian football goalkeeper
Giovanni Battista Viola (1576–1622), Italian early Baroque painter
József Viola (1896–1949), Hungarian football player and coach
Juan Violá (1883–1919), Cuban baseball player in the Cuban and Negro leagues 
Lorenza Viola, Italian physicist
Matteo Viola (born 1987), Italian tennis player
Nicolas Viola (born 1989), Italian footballer
Pedro Viola (born 1983), Dominican Major League Baseball pitcher
Roberto Eduardo Viola (1924–1994), Commander-in-Chief of the Argentine Army who was President of Argentina in 1981
Valentín Viola (born 1991), Portuguese footballer
Vincent Viola (born 1956), American businessman

See also

Viola (given name), female given name